Haemodorum tenuifolium is a plant native to southeastern Australia.

References

tenuifolium
Flora of New South Wales
Flora of Queensland
Taxa named by Allan Cunningham (botanist)